Human resource management (HRM or HR) is the strategic and coherent approach to the effective and efficient management of people in a company or organization such that they help their business gain a competitive advantage. It is designed to maximize employee performance in service of an employer's strategic objectives. Human resource management is primarily concerned with the management of people within organizations, focusing on policies and systems. HR departments are responsible for overseeing employee-benefits design, employee recruitment, training and development, performance appraisal, and reward management, such as managing pay and employee-benefits systems. HR also concerns itself with organizational change and industrial relations, or the balancing of organizational practices with requirements arising from collective bargaining and governmental laws.

The overall purpose of human resources (HR) is to ensure that the organization is able to achieve success through people. HR professionals manage the human capital of an organization and focus on implementing policies and processes. They can specialize in finding, recruiting, selecting, training, and developing employees, as well as maintaining employee relations or benefits. Training and development professionals ensure that employees are trained and have continuous development. This is done through training programs, performance evaluations, and reward programs. Employee relations deals with the concerns of employees when policies are broken, such as cases involving harassment or discrimination. Managing employee benefits includes developing compensation structures, parental leave programs, discounts, and other benefits for employees. On the other side of the field are HR generalists or business partners. These HR professionals could work in all areas or be labour relations representatives working with unionized employees.

HR is a product of the human relations movement of the early 20th century, when researchers began documenting ways of creating business value through the strategic management of the workforce. It was initially dominated by transactional work, such as payroll and benefits administration, but due to globalization, company consolidation, technological advances, and further research, HR  focuses on strategic initiatives like mergers and acquisitions, talent management, succession planning, industrial and labor relations, and diversity and inclusion. In the  global work environment, most companies focus on lowering employee turnover and on retaining the talent and knowledge held by their workforce. New hiring not only entails a high cost but also increases the risk of a new employee not being able to adequately replace the position of the previous employee. HR departments strive to offer benefits that will appeal to workers, thus reducing the risk of losing employee commitment and psychological ownership.

History

Antecedent theoretical developments
The human resources field began to take shape in 19th century Europe. It was built on a simple idea by Robert Owen (1771-1858) and Charles Babbage (1791-1871) during the industrial revolution. These men concluded that people were crucial to the success of an organization. They expressed the thought that the well-being of employees led to perfect work; without healthy workers, the organization would not survive.

HR emerged as a specific field in the early 20th century, influenced by Frederick Winslow Taylor (1856–1915). Taylor explored what he termed "scientific management" (sometimes referred to as "Taylorism"), striving to improve economic efficiency in manufacturing jobs. He eventually focused on one of the principal inputs into the manufacturing process—labor—sparking inquiry into workforce productivity.

Meanwhile, in England, C S Myers, inspired by unexpected problems among soldiers which had alarmed generals and politicians in the First World War of 1914–1918, co-founded the National Institute of Industrial Psychology (NIIP) in 1921. In doing so, he set seeds for the human relations movement. This movement, on both sides of the Atlantic, built on the research of Elton Mayo (1880-1949) and others to document through the Hawthorne studies (1924–1932) and other studies how stimuli, unrelated to financial compensation and working conditions, could yield more productive workers.
Work by Abraham Maslow (1908–1970), Kurt Lewin (1890–1947), Max Weber (1864–1920), Frederick Herzberg (1923–2000), and David McClelland (1917–1998), forming the basis for studies in industrial and organizational psychology, organizational behavior and organizational theory, was interpreted in such a way as to further claims of legitimacy for an applied discipline.

Birth and development of the discipline
By the time enough theoretical evidence existed to make a business case for strategic workforce management, changes in the business landscape - à la Andrew Carnegie (1835-1919), John Rockefeller (1839-1937) - and in public policy - à la Sidney (1859-1947) and Beatrice Webb (1858-1943), Franklin D. Roosevelt and the New Deal of 1933 to 1939 - had transformed employer-employee relationships, and the HRM discipline became formalized as "industrial and labor relations". In 1913 one of the oldest known professional HR associations—the Chartered Institute of Personnel and Development (CIPD)—started in England as the Welfare Workers' Association; it changed its name a decade later to the Institute of Industrial Welfare Workers, and again the next decade to Institute of Labour Management before settling upon its current name in 2000. From 1918 the early Soviet state institutions began to implement a distinct ideological HRM focus
alongside technical management - first in the Red Army (through political commissars alongside military officers), later (from 1933) in work sites more generally (through partorg posts alongside conventional managers).

In 1920, James R. Angell delivered an address to a conference on personnel research in Washington detailing the need for personnel research. This preceded and led to the organization of the Personnel Research Federation. In 1922 the first volume of The Journal of Personnel Research was published, a joint initiative between the National Research Council and the Engineering Foundation. Likewise in the United States, the world's first institution of higher education dedicated to workplace studies—the School of Industrial and Labor Relations—formed at Cornell University in 1945. In 1948 what would later become the largest professional HR association—the Society for Human Resource Management (SHRM)—formed as the American Society for Personnel Administration (ASPA).

In the Soviet Union, meanwhile, Stalin's use of patronage exercised through the "HR Department" equivalent in the Bolshevik Party, its Orgburo, demonstrated the effectiveness and influence of human-resource policies and practices,
and Stalin himself acknowledged the importance of the human resource,
exemplified in his mass deployment of it, as in the five-year plans and in the Gulag system.

During the latter half of the 20th century, union membership declined significantly,
while workforce-management specialists continued to expand their influence within organizations. In the US, the phrase "industrial and labor relations" came into use to refer specifically to issues concerning collective representation, and many companies began referring to the proto-HR profession as "personnel administration".
Many current HR practices originated with the needs of companies in the 1950s to develop and retain talent.

In the late 20th century, advances in transportation and communications greatly facilitated workforce mobility and collaboration. Corporations began viewing employees as assets. "Human resources management" consequently, became the dominant term for the function—the ASPA even changing its name to the Society for Human Resource Management (SHRM) in 1998.

"Human capital management" (HCM)
is sometimes used synonymously with "HR", although "human capital" typically refers to a more narrow view of human resources; i.e., the knowledge the individuals embody and can contribute to an organization. Other terms sometimes used to describe the HRM field include "organizational management", "manpower management", "talent management", "personnel management", "workforce management", and simply "people management".

In popular media
Several popular media productions have depicted human resource management in operation. On the U.S. television series of The Office, HR representative Toby Flenderson is sometimes portrayed as a nag because he constantly reminds coworkers of company policies and government regulations.
Long-running American comic strip Dilbert frequently portrays sadistic HR policies through the character Catbert, the "evil director of human resources".
An HR manager is the title character in the 2010 Israeli film The Human Resources Manager, while an HR intern is the protagonist in 1999 French film Ressources humaines. The main character in the BBC sitcom dinnerladies, Philippa, is an HR manager.  The protagonist of the Mexican telenovela Mañana es para siempre is a director of human resources. Up In the Air is centered on corporate "downsizer" Ryan Bingham (George Clooney) and his travels. As the film progresses, HR is portrayed as a data-driven function that deals with people as metrics, which can lead to absurd outcomes for real people.

Practice

Business function 
Dave Ulrich lists the function of HR as:

 aligning HR strategy with business strategy
 re-engineering organization processes
 listening and responding to employees
 managing transformation and change.

At the macro-level, HR is in charge of overseeing organizational leadership and culture. HR also ensures compliance with employment and labor laws, which differ by geography, and often oversees health, safety, and security. Based on the geographic location, various laws may apply. In federal jurisdictions, there may be several federal laws that are crucial for HR managers to be familiar with in order to protect both their company and its employees. In the United States of America, important federal laws and regulations include the Fair Labor Standards Act of 1938, which includes establishing a minimum wage and protecting the right for certain workers to earn overtime. The 1964 Federal Civil Rights Law protects against discrimination and prohibits making any hiring or firing decision based on race, age, sex, and gender. The Family and Medical Leave Act gives eligible employees up to twelve weeks of unpaid leave for family and medical reasons. Ensuring the company is compliant with all laws and regulations is an important aspect of HR and will protect the company from any sort of 'legal liability'. In circumstances where employees desire and are legally authorized to hold a collective bargaining agreement, HR will typically also serve as the company's primary liaison with the employee's representatives (usually a labor union). Consequently, HR, usually through representatives, engages in lobbying efforts with governmental agencies (e.g., in the United States, the United States Department of Labor and the National Labor Relations Board) to further its priorities.

Human resource management has four basic functions: staffing, training and development, motivation, and maintenance. Staffing is the recruitment and selection of potential employees done through interviewing, applications, networking, etc. There are two main factors to staffing: attracting talented recruits that meet the organization's requirements and hiring resources. HR Managers must create detailed recruitment strategies and have a plan of action to put forward when recruiting. Next, managers can put strategies into place through hiring resources, by extending out to find the best possible recruits for the team. Recruiting is very competitive since every company wants the best candidates. Using tactics such as mass media can grab the attention of prospective recruits. Training and development is the next step and involves a continuous process of training and developing competent and adapted employees. Here, motivation is seen as key to keeping employees highly productive. This includes employee benefits, performance appraisals, and rewards. Employee benefits, appraisals, and rewards are all encouragements to bring forward the best employees. The last function, maintenance, involves keeping the employees' commitment and loyalty to the organization.  Managing for employee retention involves strategic actions to keep employees motivated and focused so they elect to remain employed and fully productive for the benefit of the organization. Some businesses globalize and form more diverse teams. HR departments have the role of making sure that these teams can function and that people can communicate across cultures and across borders. The discipline may also engage in mobility management, especially for expatriates; and it is frequently involved in the merger and acquisition process. HR is generally viewed as a support function to the business, helping to minimize costs and reduce risk.

In startup companies, trained professionals may perform HR duties. In larger companies, an entire functional group is typically dedicated to the discipline, with staff specializing in various HR tasks and functional leadership engaging in strategic decision-making across the business. To train practitioners for the profession, institutions of higher education, professional associations, and companies have established programs of study dedicated explicitly to the duties of the function. Academic and practitioner organizations may produce field-specific publications. HR is also a field of research study that is popular within the fields of management and industrial/organizational psychology, with research articles appearing in a number of academic journals, including those mentioned later in this article.

One of the frequent challenges of HRM is dealing with the notion of unitarism (seeing a company as a cohesive whole, in which both employers and employees should work together for a common good) and securing a long-term partnership of employees and employers with common interests.

Careers 
There are half a million HR practitioners in the United States and millions more worldwide. The Chief HR Officer or HR Director is the highest ranking HR executive in most companies. He or she typically reports directly to the chief executive officer and works with the Board of Directors on CEO succession.

Within companies, HR positions generally fall into one of two categories: generalist and specialist. Generalists support employees directly with their questions, grievances, and work on a range of projects within the organization. They "may handle all aspects of human resources work, and thus require an extensive range of knowledge. The responsibilities of human resources generalists can vary widely, depending on their employer's needs." Specialists, conversely, work in a specific HR function. Some practitioners will spend an entire career as either a generalist or a specialist while others will obtain experiences from each and choose a path later. The position of HR manager has been chosen as one of the best jobs in the US, with a #4 ranking by CNN Money in 2006 and a #20 ranking by the same organization in 2009, due to its pay, personal satisfaction, job security, future growth, and benefit to society.

Human resource consulting is a related career path where individuals may work as advisers to companies and complete tasks outsourced from companies. In 2007, there were 950 HR consultancies globally, constituting a US$18.4 billion market. The top five revenue generating firms were Mercer, Ernst & Young, Deloitte, Watson Wyatt (now part of Towers Watson), Aon (now merged with Hewitt), and PwC consulting. For 2010, HR consulting was ranked the #43 best job in America by CNN Money.

Some individuals with PhDs in HR and related fields, such as industrial and organizational psychology and management, are professors who teach HR principles at colleges and universities. They are most often found in Colleges of Business in departments of HR or Management. Many professors conduct research on topics that fall within the HR domain, such as financial compensation, recruitment, and training.

Virtual human resources 
Technology has a significant impact on HR practices. Utilizing technology makes information more accessible within organizations, eliminates time doing administrative tasks, allows businesses to function globally, and cuts costs. Information technology has improved HR practices in the following areas:

E-recruiting 
Recruiting has mostly been influenced by information technology. In the past, recruiters relied on printing in publications and word of mouth to fill open positions. HR professionals were not able to post a job in more than one location and did not have access to millions of people, causing the lead time of new hires to be drawn out and tiresome. With the use of e-recruiting tools, HR professionals can post jobs and track applicants for thousands of jobs in various locations all in one place. Interview feedback, background checks and drug tests, and onboarding can all be viewed online. This helps HR professionals keep track of all of their open jobs and applicants in a way that is faster and easier than before. E-recruiting also helps eliminate limitations of geographic location.

Human resources information systems 
HR professionals generally handle large amounts of paperwork on a daily basis, ranging from department transfer requests to confidential employee tax forms. Forms must be on file for a considerable period of time. The use of human resources information systems (HRIS) has made it possible for companies to store and retrieve files in an electronic format for people within the organization to access when needed, thereby eliminating the need for physical files and freeing up space within the office. HRIS also allows for information to be accessed in a timelier manner; files can be accessible within seconds. Having all of the information in one place also allows for professionals to analyze data quickly and across multiple locations because the information is in a centralized location.

Training 
Technology allows HR professionals to train new staff members in a more efficient manner. This gives employees the ability to access onboarding and training programs from virtually anywhere. This eliminates the need for trainers to meet new hires face-to-face when completing necessary paperwork for new employees. Training in virtual classrooms makes it possible for HR professionals to train a large number of employees quickly and to assess their progress through computerized testing programs. Some employers choose to incorporate an instructor with virtual training so that new hires are receiving training considered vital to the role. Employees have greater control over their own learning and development; they can engage in training at a time and place of their choosing, which can help them manage their work–life balance. Managers are able to track the training through the internet, which can help to reduce redundancy in training and training costs.

Education 

Some universities offer programs of study for human resources and related fields. The School of Industrial and Labor Relations at Cornell University was the world's first school for college-level study in HR. It currently offers education at the undergraduate, graduate, and professional levels, and it operates a joint degree program with the Samuel Curtis Johnson Graduate School of Management.

Many colleges and universities house departments and institutes related to the field, either within a business school or in another college. Most business schools offer courses in HR, often in their departments of management. In general, schools of human resources management offer education and research in the HRM field from diplomas to doctorate-level opportunities. The master's-level courses include MBA (HR), MM (HR), MHRM, MIR, etc. (See Master of Science in Human Resource Development for curriculum.) Various universities all over the world have taken up the responsibility of training human-resource managers and equipping them with interpersonal and intrapersonal skills so as to relate better at their places of work. As Human resource management field is continuously evolving due to technology advances of the Fourth Industrial Revolution, it is essential for universities and colleges to offer courses which are future oriented.

In the United States of America, the Human Resources University trains federal employees.

Professional associations 

There are a number of professional associations, some of which offer training and certification. The Society for Human Resource Management, which is based in the United States, is the largest professional association dedicated to HR, with over 285,000 members in 165 countries. It offers a suite of Professional in Human Resources (PHR) certifications through its HR Certification Institute. The Chartered Institute of Personnel and Development, based in England, is the oldest professional HR association, with its predecessor institution being founded in 1918.

Several associations also serve niches within HR. The Institute of Recruiters (IOR) is a recruitment professional association, offering members education, support and training. WorldatWork focuses on "total rewards" (i.e., compensation, benefits, work life, performance, recognition, and career development), offering several certifications and training programs dealing with remuneration and work–life balance. Other niche associations include the American Society for Training & Development and Recognition Professionals International.

A largely academic organization that is relevant to HR is the Academy of Management that has an HR division. This division is concerned with finding ways to improve the effectiveness of HR. The academy publishes several journals devoted in part to research on HR, including Academy of Management Journal and Academy of Management Review, and it hosts an annual meeting.

Publications

Academic and practitioner publications dealing exclusively with HR:
 Cornell HR Review
 HR Magazine (SHRM)
 Human Resource Management
 Human Resource Management Review
 International Journal of Human Resource Management
 Perspectives on Work (LERA)

Related publications:
 Academy of Management Journal
 Academy of Management Review
 Administrative Science Quarterly
 International Journal of Selection and Assessment
 Journal of Applied Psychology
 Journal of Management
 Journal of Occupational and Organizational Psychology
 Journal of Personnel Psychology
 Organization Science
 Personnel Psychology

See also 
 Aspiration management
 Domestic inquiry
 Employment agency
 Human resource management system
 Occupational Health Science
 Organization development
 Organizational theory
 Realistic job preview
 Recruitment

Notes

References
Johnason, P. (2009). HRM in changing organizational contexts. In D. G. Collings & G. Wood (Eds.), Human resource management: A critical approach (pp. 19–37). London: Routledge.
E McGaughey, 'A Human is not a Resource' (2018) Centre for Business Research, University of Cambridge Working Paper 497

External links